Marching On! is a 1943 American race film directed and written by Spencer Williams. Sequences were filmed at Fort Huachuca, Arizona. The film was later rereleased with additional musical sequences under the title Where's My Man To-nite?.

Plot 
The film focuses on a young African American who continues his family’s tradition of military service when he is drafted into the United States Army during World War II. Despite complications that arise during his basic training, including his jealousy following his girlfriend's flirtatious attention to his sergeant, the young soldier becomes a hero when he locates Japanese saboteurs operating a radio station outside of his military base.

Cast 
Hugo Martin as Rodney Tucker Jr.
George T. Sutton as Gramps Sam Tucker
Emmet Jackson as Sgt. Robert L. Keene
"Pepper" Neely as Wash, soldier
Mickey McZekkashing as Wimpy, soldier
Myra D. Hemmings as Mrs. Ellen Tucker
Clarissy Deary as Ginny
L.K. Smith as Rufus
John Hemmings as Rodney Tucker Sr.
Georgia Kelly as Martha Adams

References

External links 

1943 films
1940s English-language films
American black-and-white films
Films directed by Spencer Williams
Race films
World War II films made in wartime
American drama films
1943 drama films